Jasmine Estates is a census-designated place (CDP) in Pasco County, Florida, United States.  The population was 18,989 according to the 2010 census.

Geography

Demographics

As of the census of 2000, there were 18,213 people, 8,361 households, and 5,275 families residing in the CDP. The racial makeup of the CDP was 94.46% White, 1.63% African American, 0.32% Native American, 0.88% Asian, 0.02% Pacific Islander, 1.21% from other races, and 1.49% from two or more races. Hispanic or Latino of any race were 6.07% of the population.

There were 8,361 households, out of which 21.3% had children under the age of 18 living with them, 47.4% were married couples living together, 11.4% had a female householder with no husband present, and 36.9% were non-families. 31.4% of all households were made up of individuals, and 20.4% had someone living alone who was 65 years of age or older.  The average household size was 2.18 and the average family size was 2.67.

In the CDP, the population was spread out, with 19.1% under the age of 18, 6.2% from 18 to 24, 23.6% from 25 to 44, 20.6% from 45 to 64, and 30.4% who were 65 years of age or older.  The median age was 46 years. For every 100 females, there were 86.0 males.  For every 100 females age 18 and over, there were 83.2 males.

The median income for a household in the CDP was $26,935, and the median income for a family was $31,584. Males had a median income of $26,077 versus $21,906 for females. The per capita income for the CDP was $14,867.  About 12.0% of families and 14.3% of the population were below the poverty line, including 24.8% of those under age 18 and 9.0% of those age 65 or over.

References

Census-designated places in Pasco County, Florida
Census-designated places in Florida